"Vorbei" is a song by Austrian recording artist Christina Stürmer. It was written by Hanno Bruhn and produced by Alexander Kahr for her second studio album, Soll das wirklich alles sein?. Selected as the album's leading single, it became Stürmer's third non-consecutive number one hit in Austria, where it was certified gold by the International Federation of the Phonographic Industry (IFPI). In Germany and Switzerland, "Vorbei" served as her debut single and reached number eighty-three on the German Singles Chart.

Music video 
The video for "Vorbei" depicts Christina trashing her boyfriend's apartment as he sleeps unaware on the bed. Throughout the video, she destroys various items and draws on her boyfriend's face.

Formats and track listings

Charts

Weekly charts

Year-end charts

Certifications

References

External links
 

2004 singles
Christina Stürmer songs
Number-one singles in Austria
2004 songs
Polydor Records singles